Stanley Charlesworth (10 March 1920 – March 2003) was an English footballer who played in the Football League for Barnsley and Grimsby Town.

References

1920 births
English footballers
English Football League players
Grimsby Town F.C. players
Barnsley F.C. players
Gainsborough Trinity F.C. players
2003 deaths
Association football defenders